S74 may refer to:
 S74 (Long Island bus)
 S74 (New York City bus) serving Staten Island
 Birrana S74, an Australian speedcar
 Expressway S74 (Poland)
 Fiat S74, a racing car 
 , a submarine of the Canadian Forces
 Savoia-Marchetti S.74, an Italian airliner
 Sikorsky S-74, an American helicopter design
 
 S74, a postcode district for Barnsley, England